Nenad Kiso (born 30 April 1989) is a Bosnian-Herzegovinian footballer who plays for Serbian club Zemun.

Club career 
Born in Ljubljana, SR Slovenia, back then still part of Yugoslavia, he started playing in the FK Partizan youth teams. He spent three seasons at the Serbian Superliga club Čukarički from the Serbian capital Belgrade. He usually plays as a central midfielder. He also previously played for Debreceni VSC.

During the 2013 Winter transfer window Kiso left Debreceni for Azerbaijan Premier League side Simurq. Kiso made his debut for Simurq on 22 February 2013 in a 0–0 home draw against Baku. Kiso left Simurq at the end of his contract in December 2013.

International career 
Despite being born in Ljubljana, capital city of Slovenia, since 2008 he is member of Bosnia and Herzegovina national under-21 football team.

Career statistics

References

External links 
 

1989 births
Living people
Footballers from Ljubljana
Association football midfielders
Bosnia and Herzegovina footballers
Bosnia and Herzegovina under-21 international footballers
FK Čukarički players
FK Olimpik players
Hapoel Be'er Sheva F.C. players
Debreceni VSC players
Simurq PIK players
FK Sloboda Tuzla players
FK Borac Banja Luka players
FK Zemun players
OFK Žarkovo players
Serbian SuperLiga players
Premier League of Bosnia and Herzegovina players
Israeli Premier League players
Azerbaijan Premier League players
Bosnia and Herzegovina expatriate footballers
Expatriate footballers in Serbia
Bosnia and Herzegovina expatriate sportspeople in Serbia
Expatriate footballers in Israel
Bosnia and Herzegovina expatriate sportspeople in Israel
Expatriate footballers in Hungary
Bosnia and Herzegovina expatriate sportspeople in Hungary
Expatriate footballers in Azerbaijan
Bosnia and Herzegovina expatriate sportspeople in Azerbaijan